Rowmari (Raumari) is an upazila of Kurigram District in the Division of Rangpur, Bangladesh.

Geography
It has 26065 households and a total area 197.8 km2.

The upazila is bounded by Ulipur Upazila and Assam state of India on the north, Char Rajibpur Upazila on the south, Assam state of India on the east, Char Rajibpur, Chilmari and Ulipur upazilas on the west.

Demographics
As of the 1991 Bangladesh census, Rowmari has a population of 137040. Males constitute 49.34% of the population, and females 50.66%. This Upazila's eighteen up population is 63884. Raomari has an average literacy rate of 16.5% (7+ years), and the national average of 32.4% literate.

Administration
Raumari Thana was formed in 1908 and it was turned into an upazila on 1 August 1983.

Raomari Upazila is divided into six union parishads: Bondober, Dadevanga, Chor Shoulemari, Jadurchar, Raumari, and Shoulemari. The union parishads are subdivided into 29 mauzas and 198 villages.

See also
Upazilas of Bangladesh
Districts of Bangladesh
Divisions of Bangladesh

References

Upazilas of Kurigram District